= Massively =

Massively may refer to:

- Mass
- Massively (blog), a blog about MMOs
